In Viriconium is a novel by M. John Harrison published in 1982.

Plot summary
In Viriconium is a novel in which a city suffers from a metaphysical langour.

Reception
Dave Pringle reviewed In Viriconium for Imagine magazine, and stated that "Harrison has a wickedly acute eye for human folly; every so often this novel makes you wince as though you have just caught sight of yourself in an unfriendly mirror."

Dave Langford reviewed In Viriconium for White Dwarf #54, and stated that "Even the city's gods are trying low life, inventing horrors like 'donkey jackets, wellington boots and small white plastic trays covered in congealed food' while the plague zone grows. Oblique and enigmatic, but wonderful."

Reviews
Review by Faren Miller (1983) in Locus, #265 February 1983 
Review by David Pringle (1983) in Interzone, #4 Spring 1983 
Review by Baird Searles (1983) in Isaac Asimov's Science Fiction Magazine, June 1983 
Review by Algis Budrys (1983) in The Magazine of Fantasy & Science Fiction, July 1983 
Review by Roz Kaveney (1983) in Foundation, #29 November 1983 
Review by Vincent Omniaveritas (1983) in Cheap Truth #1 
Review [French] by Patrick Imbert (2004) in Bifrost, #34

References

1982 novels